South Station, officially The Governor Michael S. Dukakis Transportation Center at South Station, is the largest railroad station and intercity bus terminal in Greater Boston and New England's second-largest transportation center after Logan International Airport. Located at the intersection of Atlantic Avenue and Summer Street in Dewey Square, Boston, Massachusetts, the historic station building was constructed in 1899 to replace the downtown terminals of several railroads. Today, it serves as a major intermodal domestic transportation hub, with service to the Greater Boston region and the Northeastern and Midwestern United States. It is used by thousands of commuter rail and intercity rail passengers daily. Connections to the rapid transit Red Line and bus rapid transit Silver Line are made through the adjacent subway station.

The station was renamed for former Massachusetts governor Michael S. Dukakis in November 2014, though maps and station signs continue to use the shorter "South Station".

History

Need for a combined station
When the railroads serving Boston were first laid out and built, each one stopped at its own terminal. The four terminals serving the south-side railroads were as follows:
 The New York and New England Railroad crossed the Fort Point Channel from South Boston, just south of the present Summer Street Bridge, and terminated just east of Dewey Square (right at the north end of today's South Station).
 The Old Colony Railroad had a long passenger terminal on the east side of South Street, stretching from Kneeland Street south to Harvard Street. This site is now part of the South Bay Interchange, near the South Station bus terminal.
 The Boston and Albany Railroad's passenger terminal was in the block bounded by Kneeland Street, Beach Street, Albany Street (now Surface Artery) and Lincoln Street. This later became a freight house, and is now a block in Chinatown; the passenger terminal was moved to the west side of Utica Street, from Kneeland Street south to a bit past Harvard Street, now part of the South Bay Interchange.
 The Boston and Providence Railroad continued straight where it now merges with the Boston and Albany, terminating at Park Square, with the passenger terminal on the south side of Providence Street from Columbus Avenue west about two-thirds of the way to Berkeley Street.

By the late 19th century, the New England, Old Colony, and Boston & Providence had been acquired by the New York & New Haven Railroad, while the B&A was acquired by the New York Central Railroad. However, the four separate terminals remained. The Boston Terminal Company, established in 1897, was charged with the task of consolidating service from the four terminals at a single terminal (a union station).

Early years
South Station opened in 1899 at a cost of $3.6 million (1899 dollars). The architects were Shepley, Rutan and Coolidge of Boston, and the construction was undertaken by the engineering firm of Westinghouse, Church, Kerr & Co. The station opened on January 1 for use by Old Colony Division and Midland Division trains, the latter of which had been using the Old Colony terminal since August 22, 1896 to allow for construction. B&A trains began using South Station on July 23, followed by Providence Division trains on September 10 (along with the opening of Back Bay station).

It became the busiest station in New England by 1913.  A stop on the Atlantic Avenue Elevated served South Station from 1901 to 1938; what is now the Red Line subway was extended from Park Street to South Station in 1913. The train shed, originally one of the largest in the world, was eliminated in a 1930 renovation due to corrosion caused by the nearby ocean's salt air.

In the original configuration, two tracks came off each approach to join into a four-track line and then run under the main platforms in a two-track loop. These tracks were never put into service, and later became a parking lot and bowling alley for employees.

While the station handled 125,000 passengers each day during World War II, post-war passenger rail traffic declined in the US. In 1959, the New Haven's Old Colony Division–successor of the Old Colony Railroad–which had served the South Shore and Cape Cod, stopped passenger service. The New Haven itself went bankrupt in 1961. South Station was sold to the Boston Redevelopment Authority (BRA) in 1965. Portions of the station were demolished and the land was used to build the Boston South Postal Annex and the Stone and Webster building.

In the early 1970s, the BRA developed plans to demolish the rest of the station and replace it with a multi-use development including a new train station, a bus station, a parking garage, and commercial structures.  The plan was never realized, and South Station was added to the National Register of Historic Places in 1975.

Renovations

In 1978, the BRA sold what was left of the station to the MBTA, though the BRA retained air rights over the station. Funding was obtained for a major renovation of the station that was completed in 1989. A total of 13 tracks became available, all with high level platforms and some capable of handling 12-car trains. Piers were installed for the eventual construction of an office building and bus station above the tracks.  This renovation also added direct access to the Red Line subway station from inside the surface station lobby; previously, the only access was via street stairwells. The Central Artery/Tunnel Project (Big Dig) occupied almost all of the building's office space beginning in July 1988.

After some delays, an inter-city bus terminal opened in October 1995, replacing one on top of the I-93 Dewey Square Tunnel diagonally across from the station between Summer Street and Congress Street. The new bus terminal has direct ramp connections to I-93 and the Massachusetts Turnpike. The renovations, including the bus terminal, cost $195 million in 2001 dollars.

In September 2017, the Ashkenazy Acquisition Corporation, which also owns the Faneuil Hall Marketplace, purchased the 98-year lease on the office space and concourse areas of the station from the Blackstone Group for $123.2 million.

In August 2019, the Federal Railroad Administration awarded MassDOT up to $41.2 million to replace much of the Tower 1 interlocking outside South Station. The remaining $41 million of the $82 million project will be funded by Amtrak and the MBTA. , completion is expected in 2026. Bidding for the $68.7 million main construction contract opened in September 2022. The MBTA awarded the contract at a higher cost of $99 million in February 2023.

South Station Tower

When the Boston Redevelopment Authority sold South Station to the MBTA in 1977, the BRA retained the air rights over the tracks. The South Station Tower complex, which is being built on the air rights, will include a 51-story,  skyscraper and an expansion of the bus terminal. Construction began in January 2020 and is expected to take four years. The tower is being built on foundations put in place when the station was last renovated. The project will include an expansion of the outdoor waiting area with a new arched roof, a roof covering the entire platform area, a new entrance from Dorchester Avenue, and a more direct connection to the bus terminal.

Architecture

The South Station head house and wings incorporate Neoclassical architecture. The building's symmetry and stone façade are common to the style. The granite came from nearby quarries in New England. The main doorways are located in a section that protrudes from the curving shape of the building. The doors are housed under tall arches that give the impression of grandeur while also making the building appear smaller from far away. This visual trick is common in classical buildings and is further amplified by the oversized windows and large balustrade on the third floor and roof.

Above the doorways are classical Ionic order columns that ostensibly hold up the frieze and pediment. Uncommon for Ionic order columns is the lack of fluting, which is usually used to draw the eye upward, increasing the grandeur of the facade. The numerous projections and recessions on the façade attribute to the planar quality of the building, while also creating interesting shading and lighting patterns on the stone and within the building.

Inside, a coffered ceiling adorns the terminal and protects travelers from the rain and snow.

Constructed over 100 years ago, the clock on top of the main head house is the largest operating hand-wound clock mechanism in New England. In 2008, the clock underwent a six-week restoration and repair. The clock mechanism was completely disassembled and transported to a nearby workshop, where replacement pieces had to be fabricated by hand. The clock, once one of many in the city, is a hallmark of a bygone era—something that commuters rely on to make their trains, and which visitors admire for its historical presence. The eagle imitates the figurines commonly placed atop classically styled buildings.

The curved shape of the building facade pushes its presence into the surrounding area, making it much more prominent. This also gives the building a more distinctive and accessible main entrance from Atlantic Avenue, Summer Street, and Dewey Square. A similar concept is also seen in the Santa Maria della Pace in Rome, Italy. This church didn't directly influence South Station, but the designs clearly share the same effects on the immediate area.

In the 1980s, with South Station in disrepair, a great effort began to revitalize the station using Federal funding. The revitalization included addition of two wings that extend from each side of the head house, constructed with granite from the same quarries to provide a consistent appearance. Renovation and expansion was completed in 1989, reinvigorating the area with a vital transportation link and a strong focal point. Office buildings began rising nearby, expanding the downtown area. With the completion of the Big Dig and the Rose Kennedy Greenway, South Station has become an even more important feature in the area. The Greenway provides a pedestrian-friendly connection between South Station and North Station.

Services

South Station is served by heavy rail, rapid transit, and bus. It is the northern terminus of Amtrak's Northeast Corridor and is served by the Acela Express, the Northeast Regional, and the Boston section of the Lake Shore Limited. It is also the downtown terminus of the nine southern lines of the MBTA Commuter Rail system. A underground subway station serves the Red Line and the Silver Line bus rapid transit system's Waterfront routes (SL1, SL2, and SL3).

South Station's amenities include: 

 Parking garage
 Staffed ticket windows
 24-hour baggage assistance
 A 24-hour information booth
 A Metropolitan Lounge with several complimentary services
 A food court, small shopping variety, and waiting area, with typical train station concessions. Food vendors include Au Bon Pain, Auntie Anne's, Dunkin' Donuts, McDonald's, Pinkberry, Starbucks and Regina Pizzeria. Shopping vendors include a bookstore, a news-stand, a Boston-themed souvenir shop and a florist.
 A two-floor CVS Pharmacy, which replaced the Clarke's bar in 2013.
 Public art, including a sculpture built of railroad car couplers and a model of the planet Jupiter (the latter is part of the Museum of Science's scale model of the solar system)
 Free Wi-Fi

The station is accessible by the general public 24 hours a day, every day of the year.

Bus terminal

Boston's main inter-city bus terminal, the South Station Bus Terminal, is housed in a separate building built over the train platforms along Atlantic Avenue. The bus terminal hosts service by Greyhound, Peter Pan, and other bus companies; to all of New England, New York City, upstate New York, Atlantic City (New Jersey), Philadelphia, Washington, D.C., the mid-Atlantic states, and Montreal, Canada. The bus terminal has its own concession area, and can be entered from the railway platform area or directly from Atlantic Avenue.

Connection to North Station
There has not been a direct public transit connection between the two stations since the closure of the Atlantic Avenue Elevated in 1938. Currently, passengers can transfer between the two stations at via the Orange Line at Back Bay, the Red Line at Porter, or the Silver Line at Chelsea, but passengers not passing through any of these stations must use two subway lines with a transfer at either Park Street or Downtown Crossing.

A North–South Rail Link has been proposed to unify the two halves of the rail system and make passenger transfers much easier and faster. However, as of May 2006, the Commonwealth of Massachusetts has withdrawn its sponsorship of the proposal due to its high cost. The North–South Rail Link is not mentioned in the MBTA's FY2010–FY2014 Capital Investment Program. Currently, passenger equipment is transferred between the two halves of the system via the Grand Junction Railroad, which is not used in revenue passenger service.

Accessibility

The commuter rail and Amtrak platforms are fully accessible, with level access from the main station entrance and the waiting area onto the high-level platforms. Most southside commuter rail stations are also handicapped accessible, but some stations (mostly on the Framingham/Worcester Line and Franklin Line) are not. Most Amtrak stations on the Lake Shore Limited and the Northeast Corridor routes are also accessible.

Elevators are provided for handicapped access to the subway station. The bus station can be reached via the track 1 platform.

South Station Expansion Project

As a major transfer station offering connections to multiple modes, South Station is expected to see additional passenger throughput as a result of system improvements and a general increase in ridership. The existing underground Red Line and Silver Line stations are adequate for the near future, but the surface-level commuter rail and Amtrak platforms are at capacity.

A proposed relocation of the Boston General Mail Facility, which is located on Dorchester Avenue next to the station tracks, would allow for increased capacity at South Station. Seven more tracks are planned to be added to the existing thirteen tracks, allowing increased use by both MBTA Commuter Rail and Amtrak trains.

In October 2010, the Commonwealth of Massachusetts was awarded a $32.5 million grant from the federal government to begin planning for this expansion. After deliberations, a $43 million contract (including $10.5 million in state funds) was awarded in August 2012. The planning project will advance the new station area, including a possible passenger mezzanine over the platforms, to the 30% design level. Other elements include a redesign of the South Station interlocking, new commuter rail layover facilities, and the restoration of public access to the adjacent section of Dorchester Avenue and the Fort Point Channel, filling in a missing half-mile segment of the Boston Harborwalk. The station expansion is intended to allow for increases in commuter rail service on the Fairmount Line and Framingham/Worcester Line, addition of South Coast Rail service, and increased Amtrak frequencies.

As of October 2014, purchasing of the postal facility is in limbo, as the Postal Service is not willing to accept the amount offered by the state. Part of this deal would include moving the facility to South Boston, with MassPort taking some of the Post Office's parking lot located across Fort Point Channel.

The Final Environmental Impact Report for the South Station Expansion Project was released on June 30, 2016. The project would begin with the demolition of the postal facility and take 5 years to complete. The Massachusetts Executive Office of Energy and Environmental Affairs approved the FEIR on August 12, 2016.

The South Station Expansion Project has been opposed by a number of transportation advocates, community groups, and environmental groups, many of which instead advocate building a North–South Rail Link (NSRL) through connection to North Station and points beyond, rather than expanding the dead-end storage capacity for trains at South Station. Prominent NSRL supporters include former Governor Michael S. Dukakis (Democrat) and former Governor William F. Weld (Republican), who have made joint public appearances regarding this issue. Based on their advocacy, MassDOT agreed to fund a $2 million study in February 2016. The NSRL reevaluation report was released in June 2018. Its tunnel options included a four-track maximum-service plan, estimated to cost $21.5 billion and three double-track routes ranging in cost from $12.3 to 14.7 billion. South Station expansion was estimated to cost $4.7 billion. These costs are in 2018 dollars and include purchasing additional rolling stock, other required infrastructure improvements and a 3.5% annual inflation rate.

See also
 Atlantic Avenue Elevated
 Fort Point Channel
 North Station
 North-South Rail Link
 South Station Bus Terminal
 National Register of Historic Places listings in northern Boston, Massachusetts

References

External links

 
 South Station – MBTA

 South Station Expansion Project Information – MassDOT
 Boston Athenæum: Boston and Albany Railroad Company and South Station. Digital Collection. Photographs.

Boston South
Landmarks in Financial District, Boston
MBTA Commuter Rail stations in Boston
Stations on the Northeast Corridor
Railway stations in Boston
Railway stations on the National Register of Historic Places in Massachusetts
Railway stations in the United States opened in 1899
Boston South
Boston South
Historic American Engineering Record in Massachusetts
Transit centers in the United States
South Station
National Register of Historic Places in Boston